Sarhang may refer to:

 Sarhang (rank)
 Male name in Kurdish.
Sarhang Mohsen, Iraqi footballer
Sarhang, Kohgiluyeh and Boyer-Ahmad, a village in Iran
Sarhang, Razavi Khorasan, a village in Iran